"I Hear a Symphony" is a 1965 song recorded by the Supremes for the Motown label.

Written and produced by Motown's main production team, Holland–Dozier–Holland, the song became their sixth number-one pop hit on the Billboard Hot 100 pop singles chart in the United States for two weeks from November 14, 1965, through November 27, 1965. On the UK singles chart, the single peaked at number thirty-nine.

History

Overview
The Supremes enjoyed a run of hits through 1964 and 1965 under the guidance of writer/producers Holland–Dozier–Holland. In mid-1965, the producers came to realize they had fallen into a rut when the Supremes' "Nothing but Heartaches" failed to make it to the Top Ten, missing it by just one position and breaking the string of number-one Supremes hits initiated with "Where Did Our Love Go." Motown chief Berry Gordy was displeased with the performance of "Nothing but Heartaches," and circulated a memo around the Motown offices that read as follows:

Holland-Dozier-Holland therefore set about breaking their formula and trying something new. The result was "I Hear a Symphony," a song with a more complex musical structure than previous Supremes releases. "Symphony" was released as a single in place of another Holland-Dozier-Holland Supremes song, "Mother Dear", which had been recorded in the same style as their earlier hits.

In a 1968 interview, Diana Ross said that this was one of her favorite songs to perform, even though its key register posed some challenges.

Billboard called the song a "blockbuster" as well as a "well-written rhythm ballad with pulsating beat and top vocal work."  Cash Box described it as a "rhythmic, medium-paced romancer about a lucky gal who’s head-over-heels in love with the special guy of her dreams."

"I Hear a Symphony", later issued on an album of the same name, became the Supremes' sixth number-one hit in the United States. After the number-five hit "My World Is Empty Without You" and the number-nine hit "Love Is Like an Itching in My Heart," the Supremes began a run of four more number-one hits: "You Can't Hurry Love," "You Keep Me Hangin' On," "Love Is Here and Now You're Gone," and "The Happening." The group performed the hit song on The Mike Douglas Show on November 3, 1965.

Personnel
 Lead vocals by Diana Ross
 Background vocals by Florence Ballard and Mary Wilson
 Instrumentation by the Funk Brothers
Baritone saxophone by Mike Terry

Charts

Weekly charts

Year-end charts

Certifications

See also
List of Hot 100 number-one singles of 1965 (U.S.)

References

External links
 

1965 singles
The Supremes songs
Songs written by Holland–Dozier–Holland
Motown singles
Song recordings produced by Brian Holland
Song recordings produced by Lamont Dozier
1965 songs
Billboard Hot 100 number-one singles
Cashbox number-one singles